John Stanier may refer to:

John Stanier (British Army officer) (1925–2007), Chief of the General Staff (United Kingdom), 1982–1985
John Stanier (drummer) (born 1968)
John Stanier (cinematographer), cinematographer of Fame (1980 film)